The Estadio Universitario ("University Stadium") – nicknamed El Volcán (Spanish for "The Volcano") is a football stadium located on the campus of the Universidad Autónoma de Nuevo León in San Nicolás de los Garza, Nuevo León, Mexico, in the metropolitan area of Monterrey.

History

Construction
Construction cost $23 million MXN when the stadium was completed in 1967. The official dedication occurred on May 30 of that year. Originally planned to hold nearly 90,000 spectators, the plan was downscaled to meet financial needs. After the 1986 FIFA World Cup, the stadium's official capacity was 52,000. Later, modifications were made to improve the fan experience and increase safety, resulting in a reduced capacity; the stadium currently seats 41,615.

Potential renovations
In 2016, a proposal was floated to build a replacement venue for Tigres that would sit atop the Santa Catarina River running through central Monterrey. The proposed stadium would have seated 80,000. The National Water Commission, CONAGUA, rejected the project as potentially affecting the flow of the river (the dry riverbed was infamously developed with parks and parking facilities that were swept away in 2010's Hurricane Alex).

Sports

Football
The stadium is the home venue for the Tigres UANL, playing in the Liga MX. It was given to Sinergia Deportiva, the for-profit company that administers Tigres, as part of the club's assets.

The stadium hosted several matches of the 1986 FIFA World Cup. It also hosted Copa Libertadores de América matches in 2005 and 2006, when Tigres qualified for the prestigious tournament. For a short period, it was also the home venue for C.F. Monterrey. It also hosted several matches of the 1983 FIFA World Youth Championship and the 2011 FIFA U-17 World Cup.

Between 1973 and 1980, C.F. Monterrey, the other top-flight soccer club in Monterrey, also used the Estadio Universitario. The club departed to return to the Estadio Tecnológico beginning in September 1980.

American football

While the Auténticos Tigres, the university's American football team, have their own stadium (the Estadio Gaspar Mass), the Estadio Universitario is normally used for playoff games and ONEFA championships. One exception was the 2016 ONEFA championship game, played at Gaspar Mass due to a playoff soccer game scheduled for the next day.

On August 5, 1996, the stadium hosted the Kansas City Chiefs and Dallas Cowboys in the American Bowl, with the Chiefs winning by a score of 32-6. The event recorded 52,247 paid tickets.

Concerts
British rock band Queen performed during The Game Tour on October 9, 1981, to more than 150,000 fans on their first and only tour of Mexico.

Artists and bands such as Rod Stewart, Guns N' Roses, The Rolling Stones, Iron Maiden, Johnny Gill, The Cure, Coldplay, Bruno Mars, Shakira, Aerosmith and Metallica have performed at the stadium.

1986 FIFA World Cup

In the 1986 FIFA World Cup held in Mexico, the stadium hosted 4 matches:

2022 CONCACAF W Championship

The 2022 CONCACAF W Championship held in Mexico, the stadium hosted 8 matches:

See also
Estadio BBVA
List of football stadiums in Mexico

References

Universitario
Sports venues in San Nicolás de los Garza
Sports venues in Nuevo León
1986 FIFA World Cup stadiums
Tigres UANL
Autonomous University of Nuevo León
American Bowl venues
College association football venues in Mexico
American football venues in Mexico